The Hille equation relates the maximum ionic conductance of an ion channel to its length and radius (or diameter), with the commonly used version implicitly takes into account a hemispherical cap.  As it is ultimately based on a macroscopic continuum model, it does not take into account molecular interactions, and real conductances are often several times less than the predicted maximal flux.

Assumptions and Derivations

Equation

The Hille equation predicts the following maximum conductance  for a pore with length , radius , in a solvent with resistivity :

Rearranging the terms, the maximal flux based on length  and diameter  can be shown to be:

Physical Implications

References

Ion channels
Electrophysiology